Adygea Airlines was the state-owned national airline of the republic of Adygea, in Russia. The company was founded in 1997 and liquidated at the end of 2009.

Liquidation
In 2008 the airline went into liquidation while the government sought an investor. Aeroflot showed interest but did not take the airline over. There was an initial attempt to sell off all assets to one buyer (at a value of 61.9 million Roubles in November 2009) but this was then divided into different lots - the airport (starting price of 21 million Roubles), aircraft maintenance base (16 million Roubles), oil base (6 million Roubles) and the aircraft each individually priced.

Fleet
The fleet was sold off as part of the liquidation process (as of December 2009) and included:

The first nine planes to be sold off raised a total of 4.16 million Roubles while the price of the Antonovs sold varied between 400,000 and 660,000 Roubles each.

References

Defunct airlines of Russia
Airlines established in 1997
Airlines disestablished in 2009
Companies based in Adygea
Government-owned companies of Russia
2009 disestablishments in Russia
Russian companies established in 1997